Rajendra Pambhoi was an Indian politician who was the member of Chhattisgarh Legislative Assembly from Bijapur Assembly constituency (no 71)  then Dantewada district, ( now Bijapur district, Chhattisgarh ), during 2003–08. He resides at tehsil and post Bhopalpatnam. He was a member of Indian National Congress.Rajendra Pambhoi died on 2011.

References

Living people
People from Bijapur district, Chhattisgarh
Year of birth missing (living people)